The Goose Steps Out is a British film released in 1942, starring Will Hay, who also co-directed with Basil Dearden. It is a comedy of mistaken identity, with Hay acting as a German spy and also an Englishman who is his double. It was the film debut of Peter Ustinov.

Plot summary

Set during the Second World War, the film recounts the adventures of William Potts (Will Hay) after it is discovered that he is an exact double of a German spy who the British have just captured. Potts is flown into Nazi Germany to impersonate the spy and instructed to seek out and bring back details of a new German secret weapon.

On arrival, however, Potts is placed in charge of a group of apparently rabidly-fascist young students who are being trained to work as spies in Britain. Potts attempts to undermine this by convincing the youngsters that the proper British way of saluting a great leader is to apply the V-sign, which they therefore do repeatedly and enthusiastically in the direction of a portrait of the Führer. At a function where he hopes to gather information about the weapon (a gasfire bomb), Potts succeeds only in getting blind drunk and admitting that he is a British agent. Luckily, some members of his class of Nazi youths turn out to be sympathetic Austrians and they help him obtain the secret he seeks. Potts and his new friends eventually commandeer a plane and fly back to Britain, crashing in a tree outside the War Office in London.

Direction

Will Hay shared directorial credit with Basil Dearden following on from their previous collaboration, The Black Sheep of Whitehall. Art Director, Michael Relph described Dearden and Hay's input as directors 'Basil was very expert at directing comedy, and that is what he contributed when working with Will Hay. Hay was important as a star, and he could more or less dictate what he wanted to direct, but really he did not direct. Basil directed and supplied all the expertise that Hay probably lacked.' Barry Morse who played Kurt had a slightly different take on the directorial responsibilities. 'Basil Dearden was largely concerned with purely technical things, angles, lenses, lighting details. He didn't have a very active part, it seemed to me, in the actual performance directing. That was something which Will Hay had a certain amount to do with.'The Goose Steps Out is also noted as the film debut of a young Peter Ustinov.

Cast

 Will Hay as William Potts/Muller
 Charles Hawtrey as Max
 Frank Pettingell as Professor Hoffman
 Julien Mitchell as General Von Glotz
 Peter Ustinov as Krauss
 Barry Morse as Kurt
 Leslie Harcourt as Vagel
 Peter Croft as Hans
 Ann Firth as Lena
 Ray Lovell as Schmidt
 Jeremy Hawk as ADC
 Aubrey Mallalieu as Rector
 John Williams as Major Bishop
 Lawrence O'Madden as Colonel Truscott
 William Hartnell as German officer at railway station (uncredited)
 Leslie Dwyer as German on train (uncredited)

Reception
Sunday Times August 30, 1942 by Dilys Powell "The Goose Steps Out gives us Will Hay as a British Agent lecturing to the German espionage class on British pronunciation and the life of the pub. This is good Will Hay and so is the attempted theft from the gas bomb laboratory: the slapstick in the plane I found more monotonous and less convivial.
 A current reviewer for TV Guide calls this film, "a funny programme."
 In Forever Ealing, George Perry wrote, " In the climate of 1942, when British morale was at its lowest, what may now seem jingoistic acted as an innocent safety valve, and the film was popularly received."

DVD/Blu-ray: In 2017 to celebrate the 75th Anniversary of the film, a digitally restored version was released by Studio Canal. The Special features include the Will Hay short film, Go to Blazes (1942), an Interview with Graham Rinaldi, author of the 2009 Will Hay biography and a Will Hay audio featurette by Simon Heffer, part of the BBC Radio 3 series, The Essay: British Film Comedians.

References

External links
 

1942 films
1942 comedy films
British black-and-white films
Ealing Studios films
Films directed by Basil Dearden
Films directed by Will Hay
Films set in England
Films set in London
Films set in Germany
World War II films made in wartime
British comedy films
1940s English-language films
1940s British films